Wii Sports Club is a sports simulation video game from Nintendo for the Wii U. It is an enhanced remake of the 2006 Wii launch title Wii Sports and features high definition graphics, online multiplayer, and Wii Remote Plus support. The game contains all five of the sports from the original game; they can be purchased individually or rented for a certain amount of time via a pass. The first set of sports (bowling and tennis) was released in Japan on October 30, 2013, in Europe and North America on November 7, 2013, and in Australia and New Zealand on November 8, 2013. Golf was later released following a Nintendo Direct presentation on December 18, 2013, while Baseball and Boxing were released on June 26, 2014, worldwide.

A retail version was released in all regions on July 11, 2014; it contains all five sports on disc and no requirement to purchase a day pass or each individual sport. The game was also the final Wii series game released on the Wii U (previously on the Wii console before Wii Play: Motion). The game received mixed to positive reviews from critics, who praised the controls and addition of online multiplayer but criticised the release model. Critics also found the game to be inferior to Wii Sports Resort (2009).

Gameplay 

Similarly to Wii Sports, players use the Wii Remote to mimic movements made during various sports, including tennis, baseball, bowling, golf, and boxing. However, the game requires the use of Wii MotionPlus, unlike the original but similarly to its sequel Wii Sports Resort, in order to refine the controls and enhance the gameplay. Players are able to join different 'clubs' representing various regions across the world, and compete online with other members of the club. Players are locked into their chosen club for 24 hours, in order to create a closer sense of community.  Players are ranked within their clubs, and clubs are able to compete with and be ranked against other clubs. Miiverse communication is also supported, and players can communicate in-game using pre-set messages and drawings from the Wii U GamePad. Some of the sports also feature ideas from a concept video shown at E3 2011 when the Wii U was first unveiled. During golf, the GamePad can be placed on the floor to display the ball on the ground, using a Wii Remote to swing over it. Baseball also allows the players to use the GamePad to aim their pitches.

Development 
The game was announced during an 18 September 2013 Nintendo Direct presentation focused on another game in the Wii series for Wii U, Wii Fit U. The first screenshots and gameplay videos were shown, along with various details about new features to the sports. It was detailed that the game will launch with bowling and tennis, with others from Wii Sports to be released at a later date. Either all sports can be rented for a 24-hour period in a 'Day Pass' or individual sports can be purchased outright for a higher price. A free 24-hour trial will be offered following initial download and installation of the software, after which the fees will be required. The game was released initially on the Nintendo eShop as a push of Nintendo's digital distribution strategy, with some ideas compared to Wii Fit U, such as the presence of a free trial.

Reception

Pre-release 
Initial reception to the concept was mixed. Most news outlets praised the addition of online multiplayer, but questioned whether it would be able to keep the gameplay fresh, and continue to attract casual gamers who were fans of the original. Nintendo Life's Thomas Whitehead said that it has "...the potential to be rather important for the Wii U’s Holiday sales performance." Other praise was aimed at Nintendo's new pricing models and options, although some commented that the total purchase price of all sports may be excessive.

Post-release 

The aggregate score on Metacritic was 68/100, indicating "mixed or average reviews". Nintendojo gave the game a B+, stating that the game had "Precise controls; solid online experience", but lacked online chat and was "bland compared to Wii Sports Resort." Nintendo World Report gave tennis a 7/10 and bowling an 8.5/10.  IGN gave Wii Sports Club a score of 8/10. Nintendo Life gave the game a 7 out of 10 stars.

Notes

References

External links 

2013 video games
Nintendo games
Nintendo Network games
Wii U eShop games
Wii U games
Wii U-only games
Baseball video games
Bowling video games
Tennis video games
Boxing video games
Golf video games
Multiple-sport video games
Video game remakes
Multiplayer and single-player video games
Video games developed in Japan
Video games scored by Kazumi Totaka